This is a list of hospitals in Australia.

Australian Capital Territory

Public
 Calvary Public Hospital – Bruce
 The Canberra Hospital – Garran
 Queen Elizabeth II Family Centre – Curtin
 University of Canberra Hospital – Belconnen

Private
 Brindabella Endoscopy and Day Surgery Centre – Garran
 Calvary John James Hospital – Deakin
 Calvary Private Hospital Bruce – Bruce
 Canberra Imaging Group Angiography/Interventional Suite – Deakin
 National Capital Private Hospital – Garran

New South Wales

Public
 Albury Wodonga Health (Albury Campus) – Albury
 Armidale Hospital – Armidale
 Auburn Hospital – Auburn
 Ballina Hospital – Ballina
 Balmain Hospital – Balmain
 Balranald Multi Purpose Service – Balranald
 Bankstown Lidcombe Hospital – Bankstown
 Baradine Multi Purpose Service – Baradine
 Barham Hospital – Barham
 Barraba Multi Purpose Service – Barraba
 Batemans Bay Hospital – Batemans Bay
 Bathurst Hospital – Bathurst
 Batlow/Adelong Multi Purpose Service – Batlow
 Bellinger River District Hospital – Bellingen
 Belmont Hospital – Belmont
 Berrigan Multi Purpose Service – Berrigan
 Bingara Multi Purpose Service – Bingara
 Blacktown Hospital – Blacktown
 Blayney Multi Purpose Service – Blayney
 Blue Mountains District ANZAC Memorial Hospital – Katoomba
 Boggabri Multi Purpose Service – Boggabri
 Bombala Multi Purpose Service – Bombala
 Bonalbo Hospital – Bonalbo
 Boorowa Multi Purpose Service – Boorowa
 Bourke Multi Purpose Service – Bourke
 Bourke Street Health Service – Goulburn
 Bowral and District Hospital – Bowral
 Braeside Hospital – Prairiewood
 Braidwood Multi Purpose Service – Braidwood
 Brewarrina Multi Purpose Service – Brewarrina
 Broken Hill Hospital – Broken Hill
 Bulahdelah Hospital – Bulahdelah
 Bulli Hospital – Bulli
 Byron Bay Hospital – Byron Bay
 Calvary Hospital – Kogarah
 Calvary Mater Newcastle Hospital – Waratah
 Camden Hospital – Camden
 Campbelltown Hospital – Campbelltown
 Canowindra Hospital – Canowindra
 Canterbury Hospital – Campsie
 Casino Hospital – Casino
 Cessnock Hospital – Cessnock
 Children's Hospital at Westmead – Westmead – Westmead
 Cobar Hospital – Cobar
 Coffs Harbour Hospital – Coffs Harbour
 Coledale Hospital – Coledale
 Collarenebri Multi Purpose Service – Collarenebri
 Concord Repatriation General Hospital – Concord
 Condobolin Hospital – Condobolin
 Coolah Multi Purpose Service – Coolah
 Coolamon Multi Purpose Service – Coolamon
 Cooma Hospital – Cooma
 Coonabarabran Hospital – Coonabarabran
 Coonamble Multi Purpose Service – Coonamble
 Cootamundra Hospital – Cootamundra
 Coraki Hospital – Coraki
 Coral Tree Family Centre – North Ryde
 Corowa Hospital – Corowa
 Cowra Hospital – Cowra
 Crookwell Hospital – Crookwell
 Cudal Health Service – Cudal
 Culcairn Multi Purpose Service – Culcairn
 Cumberland Hospital – Westmead
 David Berry Hospital – Berry
 Delegate Multi Purpose Service – Delegate
 Deniliquin Hospital – Deniliquin
 Denman Multi Purpose Service – Denman
 Dorrigo Multi Purpose Service – Dorrigo
 Dubbo Hospital – Dubbo
 Dunedoo Multi Purpose Service – Dunedoo
 Dungog Hospital – Dungog
 Eugowra Hospital – Eugowra
 Fairfield Hospital – Prairiewood
 Finley Hospital – Finley
 Forbes Hospital – Forbes
 Forster-Tuncurry District Hospital – Forster (opening soon)
 Gilgandra Multi Purpose Service – Gilgandra
 Glen Innes Hospital – Glen Innes
 Gloucester Hospital – Gloucester
 Goodooga Health Service – Goodooga
 Gosford Hospital – Gosford
 Goulburn Base Hospital – Goulburn
 Gower Wilson Multi Purpose Service – Lord Howe Island
 Grafton Base Hospital – Grafton
 Greenwich Hospital – Greenwich
 Grenfell Multi Purpose Service – Grenfell
 Griffith Base Hospital – Griffith
 Gulargambone Multi Purpose Service – Gulargambone
 Gulgong Health Service – Gulgong
 Gundagai Hospital – Gundagai
 Gunnedah Hospital – Gunnedah
 Guyra Multi Purpose Service – Guyra
 Hawkesbury Hospital – Windsor
 Hay Hospital – Hay
 Henty Multi Purpose Service – Henty
 Hillston Hospital – Hillston
 Holbrook Hospital – Holbrook
 Hornsby Ku-ring-gai Hospital – Hornsby
 Hunter New England Mater Mental Health Service – Newcastle
 Illawarra Mental Health Services
 Inverell Hospital – Inverell
 Ivanhoe Hospital – Ivanhoe
 Jerilderie Multi Purpose Service – Jerilderie
 John Hunter Hospital – New Lambton
 Junee Multi Purpose Service – Junee
 Justice Health Services – Malabar
 Karitane Mothercraft Society – Carramar
 Kempsey Hospital – Kempsey
 Kenmore Hospital – Kenmore
 Kiama Hospital – Kiama
 Kurri Kurri Hospital – Kurri Kurri
 Kyogle Multi Purpose Service – Kyogle
 Lake Cargelligo Multi Purpose Service – Lake Cargelligo
 Leeton Hospital – Leeton
 Lightning Ridge Multi Purpose Service – Lightning Ridge
 Lismore Base Hospital – Lismore
 Lithgow Hospital – Lithgow
 Liverpool Hospital – Liverpool
 Lockhart Hospital – Lockhart
 Long Jetty Health Care Centre – Killarney Vale
 Lourdes Hospital Dubbo – Dubbo
 Macksville Hospital – Macksville
 Maclean Hospital – Maclean
 Macquarie Hospital – North Ryde
 Maitland Hospital – Maitland
 Manilla Hospital – Manilla
 Manly Hospital – Manly
 Manning Hospital – Taree
 Menindee Health Service – Menindee
 Mercy Care Hospital – Albury – Albury
 Mercy Care Hospital – Young – Young
 Merriwa Multi Purpose Service – Merriwa
 Milton Ulladulla Hospital – Milton
 Molong Hospital – Molong
 Mona Vale Hospital – Mona Vale
 Moree Hospital – Moree
 Morisset Hospital – Morisset
 Moruya Hospital – Moruya
 Mount Druitt Hospital – Mount Druitt
 Mudgee Hospital – Mudgee
 Mullumbimby Hospital – Mullumbimby
 Murrumburrah-Harden Hospital – Harden
 Murwillumbah Hospital – Murwillumbah
 Muswellbrook Hospital – Muswellbrook
 Narrabri Hospital – Narrabri
 Narrandera Hospital – Narrandera
 Narromine Hospital – Narromine
 Nepean Hospital – Kingswood
 Neringah Hospital – Wahroonga
 Nimbin Multi Purpose Service – Nimbin
 Northern Beaches Hospital – Frenchs Forest
 Nyngan Multi Purpose Service – Nyngan
 Oberon Multi Purpose Service – Oberon
 Orange Health Service – Orange
 Pambula Hospital – Pambula
 Parkes Hospital – Parkes
 Peak Hill Hospital – Peak Hill
 Port Kembla Hospital – Warrawong
 Port Macquarie Hospital – Port Macquarie
 Portland Hospital – Portland
 Prince of Wales Hospital – Randwick
 Queanbeyan District Hospital – Queanbeyan
 Quirindi Hospital – Quirindi
 Rivendell Child, Adolescent and Family Unit – Concord West
 Riverlands Drug and Alcohol Centre – Lismore
 Royal Hospital for Women – Randwick
 Royal North Shore Hospital – St Leonards
 Royal Prince Alfred Hospital – Camperdown
 Royal Prince Alfred Institute of Rheumatology & Orthopaedics – Camperdown
 Royal Rehabilitation Hospital – Ryde
 Ryde Hospital – Eastwood
 Rylstone Multi Purpose Service – Rylstone
 Sacred Heart Hospice – Darlinghurst
 Scone Hospital – Scone
 Shellharbour Hospital – Mount Warrigal
 Shoalhaven District Memorial Hospital – Nowra
 Singleton District Hospital – Singleton
 South East Regional Hospital – Bega
 Springwood Hospital – Springwood
 St George Hospital NSW – Kogarah
 St John of God Hospital Richmond – Richmond
 St Joseph's Hospital – Auburn
 St Vincent's Hospital – Darlinghurst
 Sutherland Hospital – Caringbah
 Sydney Children's Hospital – Randwick
 Sydney Dental Hospital – Surry Hills
 Sydney Hospital (oldest hospital in Australia, dating from 1788) / Sydney Eye Hospital – Sydney
 Tamworth Hospital – Tamworth
 Temora Hospital – Temora
 Tenterfield Hospital – Tenterfield
 Thomas Walker Hospital – Concord West
 Tibooburra Hospital – Tibooburra
 Tingha Multi Purpose Service – Tingha
 Tocumwal Hospital – Tocumwal
 Tomaree Hospital – Nelson Bay
 Tottenham Multi Purpose Service – Tottenham
 Trangie Multi Purpose Service – Trangie
 Tresillian Family Care Centre, Canterbury – Belmore
 Tresillian Family Care Centre, Kingswood – Kingswood
 Trundle Multi Purpose Health Service – Trundle
 The Tweed Hospital – Tweed Heads
 Tullamore Multi Purpose Health Service – Tullamore
 Tumbarumba Multi Purpose Service – Tumbarumba
 Tumut Hospital – Tumut
 Urana Multi Purpose Service – Urana
 Urbenville Multi Purpose Service – Urbenville
 Vegetable Creek Multi Purpose Service Emmaville – Emmaville
 Wagga Wagga Calvary Hospital – Wagga Wagga
 Wagga Wagga Rural Referral Hospital – Wagga Wagga
 Walcha Multi Purpose Service – Walcha
 Walgett Hospital – Walgett
 War Memorial Hospital – Waverley
 Warialda Multi Purpose Service – Warialda
 Warren Multi Purpose Service – Warren
 Wauchope Hospital – Wauchope
 Wee Waa Hospital – Wee Waa
 Wellington Hospital – Wellington
 Wentworth Hospital – Wentworth
 Wentworth Psychiatric Services – Penrith
 Werris Creek Hospital – Werris Creek
 Westmead Hospital – Westmead
 Wilcannia Multi Purpose Service – Wilcannia
 Wilson Memorial Community Hospital, Murrurundi – Murrurundi
 Wingham Hospital – Wingham
 Wollongong Hospital – Wollongong
 Woy Woy Hospital – Woy Woy
 Wyalong Hospital – West Wyalong
 Wyong Hospital – Hamlyn Terrace
 Yaralla Estate, also known as the Dame Edith Walker Estate – Concord West
 Yass Hospital – Yass
 Young Hospital – Young

Private
 Aesthetic Day Surgery – Kogarah
 Albury Wodonga Private Hospital – West Albury
 Allowah Presbyterian Children's Hospital – Dundas
 Armidale Private Hospital – Armidale
 Ballina Day Surgery – Ballina
 Baringa Private Hospital – Coffs Harbour
 Bathurst Private Hospital – Bathurst
 Bega Valley Private Hospital – Bega
 Berkeley Vale Private Hospital – Berkeley Vale
 Brisbane Waters Private Hospital – Woy Woy
 Calvary Health Care Riverina – Wagga Wagga
 Camden Haven Medical Center (Laurieton Hospital)
 Campbelltown Private Hospital – Campbelltown
 Castle Hill Day Surgery – Castle Hill
 Castlecrag Private Hospital – Castlecrag
 Central Coast Day Hospital – Erina
 Centre for Digestive Diseases – Five Dock
 Coffs Harbour Day Surgery – Coffs Harbour
 Coolenberg Day Surgery – Port Macquarie
 Crows Nest Day Surgery – Crows Nest
 Dee Why Endoscopy Unit – Dee Why
 Diagnostic Endoscopy Centre – Darlinghurst
 Dudley-Orange Private Hospital – Orange
 Eastern Heart Clinic – Randwick
 Epping Surgery Centre – Epping
 Figtree Private Hospital – Figtree
 Forster Private Hospital – Forster
 Hastings Day Surgery – Port Macquarie
 The Hills Clinic Kellyville – Kellyville
 The Hills Private Hospital – Baulkham Hills
 Hunter Valley Private Hospital – Shortland
 Hunters Hill Private Hospital – Hunters Hill
 Hurstville Private – Hurstville
 Kareena Private Hospital – Caringbah
 Lady Davidson Private Hospital – North Turramurra
 Lake Macquarie Private Hospital – Gateshead
 Lawrence Hargrave Private Hospital – Thirroul
 Liverpool Day Surgery – Chipping Norton
 Macquarie University Hospital – Macquarie University
 Mater Hospital Sydney – North Sydney
 MetroRehab Hospital – Petersham
 Metwest Surgical – Blacktown
 Miranda Eye Surgical Centre – Miranda
 Mogo Day Surgery – Mogo
 Mosman Private Hospital – Mosman
 Mount Wilga Private Hospital (see Mount Wilga House) – Hornsby
 Nepean Private Hospital – Kingswood
 Newcastle Private Hospital – New Lambton Heights
 North Shore Private Hospital – St Leonards
 Northside Clinic – Greenwich
 Northside Cremorne Clinic – Cremorne
 Northside Macarthur Clinic – Campbelltown
 Northside West Clinic – Wentworthville
 Norwest Private Hospital – Bella Vista
 Nowra Private Hospital – Nowra
 Ophthalmic Surgery Centre (North Shore) – Chatswood
 Orange Day Surgery Centre – Orange
 Pennant Hills Day Endoscopy Centre – Pennant Hills
 Perfect Vision Day Surgery – Hornsby
 Potentialz Unlimited, Clinical Psychologies in Sydney 
 Port Macquarie Private Hospital – Port Macquarie
 Prince of Wales Private Hospital – Randwick
 Radiation Oncology Institute – Gosford – Gosford
 Radiation Oncology Institute – The Sydney Adventist Hospital Wahroonga – Wahroonga
 San Day Surgery Hornsby – Hornsby
 The Skin & Cancer Foundation Australia – Westmead
 South Pacific Private – Curl Curl
 Southern Highlands Private Hospital – Bowral
 St George Private Hospital – Kogarah
 St John of God Burwood Hospital – Burwood
 St John of God Hospital Richmond – North Richmond
 St Luke's Hospital – Potts Point
 St Vincent's Private Sydney – Darlinghurst
 St Vincents Private Hospital [Lismore] – Lismore
 Strathfield Private Hospital – Strathfield
 The Surgery Centre Hurstville – Hurstville
 Sutherland Heart Clinic – Caringbah
 Sydney Adventist Hospital – Wahroonga
 The Sydney Clinic – Bronte
 Sydney Day Surgery – Prince Alfred – Newtown
 The Sydney Private Hospital Incorporating the NSW Eye Centre – Ashfield
 Sydney South West Private Hospital – Liverpool
 Tamara Private Hospital – Tamworth
 Tweed Day Surgery – Tweed Heads
 Ulladulla Endoscopy and Medical Centre – Ulladulla
 Vision Day Surgery Chatswood – Chatswood
 Vision Day Surgery Hurstville – Hurstville
 Wagga Endoscopy Centre – Wagga Wagga
 Warners Bay Private Hospital – Warners Bay
 Wesley Hospital Ashfield – Ashfield
 Wesley Hospital Kogarah – Kogarah
 Western Sydney Oncology – Westmead
 Westmead Private Hospital – Westmead
 Westmead Rehabilitation Hospital – Merrylands
 Wollongong Day Surgery – Wollongong
 Wolper Jewish Hospital – Woollahra

Northern Territory

Public
 Alice Springs Hospital – Alice Springs
 Gove District Hospital – Nhulunbuy
 Katherine District Hospital – Katherine
 Palmerston Regional Hospital – Holtze
 Royal Darwin Hospital – Tiwi
 Tennant Creek Hospital – Tennant Creek

Private
 Darwin Private Hospital – Tiwi

Queensland

Public

Alpha Hospital – Alpha
Aramac Primary Healthcare Centre – Aramac
Atherton Hospital – Atherton
Augathella Hospital – Augathella
Aurukun Primary Health Care Centre – Aurukun
Ayr Hospital – Ayr
Babinda Hospital – Babinda
Badu Island Health Centre – Badu Island
Baillie Henderson Hospital – Toowoomba
Bamaga Hospital – Bamaga
Baralaba Hospital – Baralaba
Barcaldine Hospital – Barcaldine
Beaudesert Hospital – Beaudesert
Biggenden Hospital – Biggenden
Biloela Hospital – Biloela
Blackall Hospital – Blackall
Blackwater Hospital – Blackwater
Boigu Island Health Centre – Boigu Island
Bollon Outpatients Clinic – Bollon
Boonah Hospital – Boonah
Boulia Primary Health Centre – Boulia
Bowen Hospital – Bowen
Bundaberg Base Hospital – Bundaberg
Burketown Health Centre – Burketown
Caboolture Hospital – Caboolture
Cairns Hospital – Cairns
Caloundra Hospital – Caloundra
Camooweal Health Centre – Camooweal
Capella Outpatients Clinic – Capella
Capricorn Coast Hospital – Yeppoon
Charleville Hospital – Charleville
Charters Towers Hospital – Charters Towers
Charters Towers Rehabilitation Unit – Charters Towers
Cherbourg Hospital – Cherbourg
Childers Hospital – Childers
Chillagoe Hospital – Chillagoe
Chinchilla Hospital – Chinchilla
Clermont Hospital – Clermont
Cloncurry Hospital – Cloncurry
Coconut Island Health Centre – Coconut Island
Coen Primary Health Care Centre – Coen
Collinsville Hospital – Collinsville
Cooktown Hospital – Cooktown
Cracow Outpatients Clinic – Cracow
Croydon Hospital – Croydon
Cunnamulla Hospital – Cunnamulla
Dajarra Health Centre – Dajarra
Dalby Hospital – Dalby
Darnley Island Primary Health Care Centre – Darnley Island
Dauan Island Health Centre – Dauan Island
Dimbulah Outpatients Clinic – Dimbulah
Dirranbandi Hospital – Dirranbandi
Doomadgee Hospital – Doomadgee
Duaringa Outpatients Clinic – Duaringa
Dysart Hospital – Dysart
Eidsvold Hospital – Eidsvold
Ellen Barron Family Centre – Chermside
Emerald Hospital – Emerald
Esk Hospital – Esk
Forsayth Hospital – Forsayth
Gatton Hospital – Gatton
Gayndah Hospital – Gayndah
Gemfields Outpatients Clinic – Sapphire
Georgetown Hospital – Georgetown
Gin Gin Hospital – Gin Gin
Gladstone Hospital – Gladstone
Glenmorgan Outpatients Clinic – Glenmorgan
Gold Coast University Hospital – Southport
Goondiwindi Hospital – Goondiwindi
Gordonvale Hospital – Gordonvale
Gurriny Yealamucka Primary Health Care Service – Yarrabah
Gympie Hospital – Gympie
Herberton Hospital – Herberton
Hervey Bay Hospital – Pialba
Home Hill Hospital – Home Hill
Hope Vale Primary Health Care Centre – Hope Vale
Hughenden Hospital – Hughenden
Ingham Hospital – Ingham
Inglewood Hospital – Inglewood
Injune Hospital – Injune
Innisfail Hospital – Innisfail
Ipswich Hospital – Ipswich
Isisford Primary Health Centre – Isisford
Island Medical Service – Thursday Island
Jandowae Hospital – Jandowae
Joyce Palmer Health Service – Palm Island
Julia Creek Hospital – Julia Creek
Jundah Primary Health Centre – Jundah
Karumba Health Centre – Karumba
Kilcoy Hospital – Kilcoy
Kingaroy Hospital – Kingaroy
Kirwan Mental Health Rehabilitation Unit – Kirwan
Kowanyama Primary Health Care Centre – Kowanyama
Kubin Primary Health Care Centre – Kubin
Laidley Hospital – Laidley
Laura Outpatients Clinic – Laura
Lockhart River Primary Health Care Centre – Lockhart River
Logan Hospital – Meadowbrook
Longreach Hospital – Longreach
Mabuiag Island Health Centre – Mabuiag Island
Mackay Base Hospital – Mackay
Magnetic Island Health Service Centre – Nelly Bay
Malakoola Primary Health Care Centre – Napranum
Malanda Outpatients Clinic – Malanda
Maleny Soldier's Memorial Hospital – Maleny
Mapoon Primary Health Care Centre – Mapoon
Mareeba Hospital – Mareeba
Marie Rose Centre – Dunwich
Maryborough Hospital – Maryborough
Mater Adult Hospital – South Brisbane
Mater Children's Hospital – South Brisbane (closed 2014)
Mater Mothers' Hospital – South Brisbane
Meandarra Outpatients Clinic – Meandarra
Miles Hospital – Miles
Millaa Millaa Outpatients Clinic – Millaa Millaa
Millmerran Hospital – Millmerran
Mitchell Hospital – Mitchell
Monto Hospital – Monto
Moonie Outpatients Clinic – Moonie
Moranbah Hospital – Moranbah
Mornington Island Hospital – Mornington Island
Morven Outpatients Clinic – Morven
Mossman Hospital – Mossman
Mount Garnet Outpatients Clinic – Mount Garnet
Mount Isa Hospital – Mornington, Mount Isa
Mount Morgan Hospital – Mount Morgan
Mount Perry Health Centre – Mount Perry
Moura Hospital – Moura
Mundubbera Hospital – Mundubbera
Mungindi Hospital – Mungindi
Murgon Hospital – Murgon
Murray Island Primary Health Centre – Murray Island
Muttaburra Primary Health Centre – Muttaburra
Nambour Hospital – Nambour
Nanango Hospital – Nanango
Normanton Hospital – Normanton
Oakey Hospital – Oakey
The Park Centre for Mental Health – Wacol
Pormpuraaw Primary Health Care Centre – Pormpuraaw
The Prince Charles Hospital – Chermside
Princess Alexandra Hospital – Woolloongabba
Proserpine Hospital – Proserpine
Queen Elizabeth II Jubilee Hospital – Coopers Plains
Queensland Children's Hospital – South Brisbane
Quilpie Hospital – Quilpie
Ravenshoe Outpatients Clinic – Ravenshoe
Redcliffe Hospital – Redcliffe
Redland Hospital – Cleveland
Redland Satellite Hospital (set to open 2023) – Redland Bay
Richmond Hospital – Richmond
Robina Hospital – Robina
Rockhampton Hospital – Rockhampton
Roma Hospital – Roma
Royal Brisbane & Women's Hospital – Herston
Royal Children's Hospital – Herston (closed 2014)
Saibai Island Primary Health Centre – Saibai Island
Sarina Hospital – Sarina
Springsure Hospital – Springsure
St George Hospital Qld – St George
St Pauls Primary Health Care Centre – St Pauls
Stanthorpe Hospital – Stanthorpe
Stephens Island Primary Health Care Centre – Stephens Island
Sunshine Coast University Hospital
Surat Hospital – Surat
Tambo Primary Health Centre – Tambo
Tara Hospital – Tara
Taroom Hospital – Taroom
Texas Hospital – Texas
Thargomindah Hospital – Thargomindah
Theodore Hospital – Theodore
Thursday Island Hospital – Thursday Island
Thursday Island Primary Health Care Centre – Thursday Island
Toowoomba Hospital – Toowoomba
Townsville Hospital – Douglas
Tully Hospital – Tully
Wallumbilla Outpatients Clinic – Wallumbilla
Wandoan Hospital – Wandoan
Warraber Island Primary Health Centre – Warraber Island
Warwick Hospital – Warwick
Weipa Hospital – Weipa
Windorah Clinic – Windorah
Winton Hospital – Winton
Wondai Hospital – Wondai
Woorabinda Hospital – Woorabinda
Wujal Wujal Primary Health Care Centre – Wujal Wujal
Wynnum Hospital – Lota
Yam Island Primary Health Centre – Yam Island
Yaraka Clinic – Yaraka
Yorke Island Primary Health Centre – Yorke Island

Private
 Allamanda Private Hospital – Southport
 Brisbane Endoscopy Services P/L – Sunnybank
 Brisbane Private Hospital – Brisbane
 Caboolture Private Hospital – Caboolture
 The Cairns Clinic – Cairns
 Cairns Day Surgery – Cairns, Queensland
 Cairns Private Hospital – Cairns
 Caloundra Private Hospital – Caloundra
 Chermside Day Hospital – Chermside
 Eye-Tech Day Surgeries – Spring Hill
 Eye-Tech Day Surgeries Southside – Upper Mt Gravatt
 Friendly Society Private Hospital – Bundaberg
 Gold Coast Private Hospital
 Greenslopes Day Surgery – Greenslopes
 Greenslopes Private Hospital – Greenslopes
 Gympie Private Hospital – Gympie
 Hervey Bay Surgical Hospital – Pialba
 Hillcrest Rockhampton Private Hospital – Rockhampton
 Hopewell Hospice – Arundel
 Ipswich Day Hospital – Ipswich
 John Flynn Private Hospital – Tugun
 Kawana Private Hospital – Birtinya
 Mackay Specialist Day Hospital – North Mackay
 Mater Children's Private Hospital – South Brisbane
 Mater Hospital Pimlico – Pimlico
 Mater Misericordiae Day Unit – Mackay
 Mater Misericordiae Hospital Bundaberg – Bundaberg
 Mater Misericordiae Hospital Gladstone – Gladstone
 Mater Misericordiae Hospital Mackay – Mackay
 Mater Misericordiae Hospital, Rockhampton – Rockhampton
 Mater Misericordiae Hospital Yeppoon – Yeppoon
 Mater Mother's Private Hospital – South Brisbane
 Mater Private Hospital Redland – Cleveland
 Mater Private Hospital South Brisbane – South Brisbane
 Mater Women's and Children's Hospital Hyde Park – Hyde Park
 Montserrat Day Hospital Gaythorne – Gaythorne
 Montserrat Day Hospital Indooroopilly – Indooroopilly
 Montserrat Day Hospital North Lakes – North Lakes
 Nambour Day Surgery – Nambour
 Nambour Selangor Private Hospital – Nambour
 New Farm Clinic – New Farm
 Noosa Hospital – Noosaville
 North Mackay Private Hospital – North Mackay
 North Queensland Day Surgery – Pimlico
 North West Private Hospital – Everton Park
 Pacific Private Day Hospital – Southport
 Peninsula Private Hospital Queensland – Kippa-Ring
 Pindara Day Procedure Centre – Benowa
 Pindara Private Hospital – Benowa
 Pine Rivers Private Hospital – Strathpine
 Queensland Eye Hospital – Spring Hill
 River City Private Hospital – Auchenflower
 Robina Procedure Centre – Robina
 Short Street Day Surgery – Southport
 South Burnett Private Hospital – Kingaroy
 Southport Day Hospital – Southport
 Southside Endoscopy Centre – Loganholme
 Spendelove Private Hospital – Southport
 St Andrew's Ipswich Private Hospital – Ipswich
 St Andrew's Toowoomba Hospital – Toowoomba
 St Andrew's War Memorial Hospital – Spring Hill
 St Stephen's Hospital Hervey Bay – Hervey Bay
 St Stephen's Hospital Maryborough – Maryborough
St Vincents Private Hospital Northside – Chermside
 St Vincent's Private Hospital Brisbane – Kangaroo Point
 St Vincent's Private Hospital Toowoomba – Toowoomba
 Sunnybank Private Hospital – Sunnybank
 Sunshine Coast Haematology and Oncology Clinic – Cotton Tree
 The Sunshine Coast Private Hospital – Buderim
 Sunshine Coast University Private Hospital – Birtinya
 Toowong Private Hospital – Toowong
 Toowoomba Surgicentre – Toowoomba
 Townsville Day Surgery – West End
 Vision Day Surgery Rivercity – Auchenflower
 Wesley Hospital – Auchenflower

South Australia

Public
 Andamooka Outpost Hospital – Andamooka
 Angaston District Hospital – Angaston
 Balaklava Soldiers Memorial District Hospital – Balaklava
 Barmera Health Service – Barmera
 Booleroo Centre District Hospital and Health Services – Booleroo Centre
 Bordertown Memorial Hospital – Bordertown
 Burra Hospital – Burra
 Ceduna District Health Service – Ceduna
 Central Yorke Peninsula Hospital (Maitland) – Maitland
 Clare Hospital – Clare
 Cleve District Hospital and Aged Care – Cleve
 Coober Pedy Hospital and Health Service – Coober Pedy
 Cowell District Hospital and Aged Care – Cowell
 Crystal Brook and District Hospital – Crystal Brook
 Cummins and District Memorial Hospital – Cummins
 Elliston Hospital – Elliston
 Eudunda Hospital – Eudunda
 Flinders Medical Centre – Bedford Park
 Gawler Health Service – Gawler East
 Glenside Campus Mental Health Service – Glenside
 Gumeracha District Soldiers Memorial Hospital – Gumeracha
 Hampstead Rehabilitation Centre – Northfield
 Hawker Memorial Hospital – Hawker
 Jamestown Hospital and Health Service – Jamestown
 Kangaroo Island Health Service – Kingscote
 Kapunda Hospital – Kapunda
 Karoonda and District Soldiers' Memorial Hospital – Karoonda
 Kimba District Hospital and Aged Care – Kimba
 Kingston Soldiers' Memorial Hospital – Kingston SE
 Lameroo District Health Service – Lameroo
 Laura and District Hospital – Laura
 Leigh Creek Health Service – Leigh Creek
 Loxton Hospital Complex – Loxton
 Lyell McEwin Hospital – Elizabeth Vale
 Mannum District Hospital – Mannum
 Marree Health Services – Marree
 Meningie & Districts Memorial Hospital & Health Services – Meningie
 Millicent & Districts Hospital & Health Service – Millicent
 Modbury Hospital – Modbury
 Mount Barker District Soldiers' Memorial Hospital – Mount Barker
 Mount Gambier and Districts Health Service – Mount Gambier
 Mount Pleasant District Hospital – Mount Pleasant
 Murray Bridge Soldiers' Memorial Hospital – Murray Bridge
 Naracoorte Health Service – Naracoorte
 Noarlunga Public Hospital – Noarlunga Centre
 Northern Yorke Peninsula Health Service (Wallaroo) – Wallaroo
 Oakden Hospital – Oakden
 Oodnadatta Clinic – Oodnadatta
 Orroroo & District Health Service – Orroroo
 Penola War Memorial Hospital – Penola
 Peterborough Soldiers' Memorial Hospital – Peterborough
 Pinnaroo Soldiers' Memorial Hospital – Pinnaroo
 Port Augusta Hospital & Regional Health Services – Port Augusta
 Port Broughton & District Hospital & Health Service – Port Broughton
 Port Lincoln Health Service – Port Lincoln
 Port Pirie Regional Health Service – Port Pirie
 Pregnancy Advisory Centre – Woodville Park
 Quorn Health Service – Quorn
 Renmark Paringa District Hospital – Renmark
 Riverland General Hospital – Berri
 Riverton District Soldiers Memorial Hospital – Riverton
 Roxby Downs Health Service – Roxby Downs
 Royal Adelaide Hospital – Adelaide
 Snowtown Hospital and Health Service – Snowtown
 South Coast District Hospital – Victor Harbor
 South East Regional CHS
 Southern Yorke Peninsula Health Service (Yorketown) – Yorketown
 St Margaret's Hospital – Semaphore
 Strathalbyn and District Health Service – Strathalbyn
 Streaky Bay Hospital – Streaky Bay
 Tailem Bend District Hospital – Tailem Bend
 Tanunda War Memorial Hospital – Tanunda
 Queen Elizabeth Hospital – Woodville
 Tumby Bay Hospital and Health Services – Tumby Bay
 Waikerie Health Service – Waikerie
 Whyalla Hospital and Health Services – Whyalla
 Women's and Children's Hospital – North Adelaide
 Woomera Hospital – Woomera
 Wudinna Hospital – Wudinna

Private
 Adelaide Clinic – Gilberton
 Adelaide Day Surgery Pty Ltd – Adelaide
 Adelaide Eye & Laser Centre – Eastwood
 Adelaide Surgicentre – Kent Town
 Ashford Hospital – Ashford
 Burnside War Memorial Hospital – Toorak Gardens
 Calvary Adelaide Hospital – Adelaide
 Calvary Central Districts Hospital – Elizabeth Vale
 Calvary North Adelaide Hospital – North Adelaide
 Flinders Private Hospital – Bedford Park
 Fullarton Private Hospital – Parkside
 Glenelg Community Hospital Inc – Glenelg South
 Griffith Rehabilitation Hospital – Hove
 Kahlyn Day Centre – Magill
 McLaren Vale & Districts War Memorial Hospital Inc – McLaren Vale
 Memorial Hospital – North Adelaide
 Mount Gambier Private Hospital – Mount Gambier
 Oxford Day Surgery Centre – Unley
 Parkside Cosmetic Surgery – Parkside
 Parkwynd Private Hospital – Adelaide
 SPORTSMED SA Hospital & Day Surgery – Stepney
 St Andrew's Hospital – Adelaide
 Stirling Hospital – Stirling
 Western Hospital – Henley Beach
 Central Surgery Skin Cancer Removal – Dulwich

Tasmania

Public
 Beaconsfield District Health Service – Beaconsfield
 Campbell Town Multi Purpose Service – Campbell Town
 Deloraine District Hospital – Deloraine
 Esperance Multi Purpose Centre – Dover
 Flinders Island Multi Purpose Centre – Whitemark
 George Town Hospital and Community Health Centre – George Town
 HealthWest (West Coast District Hospital at Queenstown) – Queenstown
 Huon Eldercare – Franklin
 King Island Multi Purpose Centre – Currie
 Launceston General Hospital – Launceston
 May Shaw District Nursing Centre – Swansea
 Mersey Community Hospital – Latrobe
 Midlands Multi Purpose Centre – Oatlands
 New Norfolk District Hospital – New Norfolk
 North East Soldiers' Memorial Hospital and Community Service Centre (Scottsdale Hospital) – Scottsdale
 North West Regional Hospital – Burnie
 Royal Hobart Hospital – Hobart
 Smithton District Hospital – Smithton
 St Helens District Hospital – St Helens
 St Marys Community Health Centre – St Marys
 Tasman Health and Community Service – Nubeena
 Toosey Memorial Hospital (Longford) – Longford

Private
 Calvary Health Care Tasmania – Lenah Valley Campus – Lenah Valley
 Calvary Health Care Tasmania – St John's Campus – South Hobart
 Calvary Health Care Tasmania – St Luke's Campus – Launceston
 Calvary Health Care Tasmania – St Vincent's Campus – Launceston
 Hobart Private Hospital – Hobart
 St Helen's Private Hospital – Hobart
 The Eye Hospital – Launceston
 The Hobart Clinic – Rokeby

Victoria

Public

Metropolitan Melbourne
Angliss Hospital – Upper Ferntree Gully
Austin Hospital – Heidelberg
Box Hill Hospital – Box Hill
Broadmeadows Hospital – Broadmeadows
Bundoora Extended Care Centre – Bundoora
Calvary Health Care Bethlehem – Caulfield South
Caritas Christi Hospice – Kew
Casey Hospital – Berwick
Caulfield Hospital – Caulfield
Craigieburn Health Service – Craigieburn
Cranbourne Integrated Care Centre – Cranbourne
Dandenong Hospital – Dandenong
Footscray Hospital – Footscray
Frankston Hospital – Frankston
Healesville Hospital and Yarra Valley Health – Healesville
Heidelberg Repatriation Hospital – Ivanhoe
Jessie McPherson Private Hospital – Clayton
Kingston Centre – Cheltenham
Maroondah Hospital – Ringwood East
Mercy Hospital for Women – Heidelberg
Monash Children's Hospital – Clayton
Monash Medical Centre – Clayton
Moorabbin Hospital – Bentleigh East
Peter James Centre – Burwood East
Peter MacCallum Cancer Institute – Melbourne
Panch Health Service – Preston
Queen Elizabeth Centre – Noble Park
Rosebud Hospital – Capel Sound
Royal Children's Hospital – Parkville
Royal Dental Hospital of Melbourne – Carlton
Royal Melbourne Hospital – Parkville
Royal Talbot Rehabilitation Centre – Kew
Royal Victorian Eye and Ear Hospital – East Melbourne
Royal Women's Hospital – Parkville
Sandringham Hospital – Sandringham
St George's Hospital – Kew
St Vincent's Hospital – Fitzroy
Sunshine Hospital – St Albans
The Alfred Hospital – Melbourne 
The Mornington Centre – Mornington
The Northern Hospital – Epping
Wantirna Health – Wantirna
Williamstown Hospital – Williamstown
Yarra Ranges Health – Lilydale

Rural hospitals and health services
Albury Wodonga Health
Alexandra District Hospital 
Alpine Health 
Bairnsdale Regional Health Service 
Ballarat Health Services 
Barwon Health 
Bass Coast Regional Health 
Beaufort and Skipton Health Service 
Beechworth Health Service 
Benalla Health 
Bendigo Base Hospital 
Boort District Health 
Casterton Memorial Hospital
Castlemaine Health 
Central Gippsland Health Service
Cobram District Health 
Cohuna District Hospital 
Colac Area Health
Djerriwarrh Health Services
Dunmunkle Health Services 
East Grampians Health Service 
East Wimmera Health Service 
Echuca Regional Health 
Edenhope and District Hospital 
Gippsland Southern Health Service 
Goulburn Valley Health 
Heathcote Health 
Hepburn Health Service 
Hesse Rural Health Service 
Heywood Rural Health 
Inglewood and District Health Service 
Kerang District Health 
Kilmore and District Hospital 
Kooweerup Regional Health Service 
Kyabram and District Health Service 
Kyneton District Health Service 
Latrobe Regional Hospital 
Lorne Community Hospital
Maldon Hospital 
Maryborough District Health Service 
Melton Health
Mildura Base Hospital 
Moyne Health Services
Nathalia District Hospital 
Northeast Health Wangaratta 
Numurkah District Health Service 
Omeo District Health 
Orbost Regional Health
Otway Health and Community Services
Portland District Health
Robinvale District Health Services 
Rochester and Elmore District Health Service 
Rural Northwest Health 
Seymour Health 
South Gippsland Hospital 
South West Healthcare
Stawell Regional Health
Swan Hill District Health
Tallangatta Health Service 
Terang and Mortlake Health Service
Timboon and District Healthcare Service
Upper Murray Health and Community Services 
Warrnambool Base Hospital
West Gippsland Healthcare Group
West Wimmera Health Service 
Western District Health Service 
Wimmera Health Care Group 
Yarram and District Health Service 
Yarrawonga Health 
Yea and District Memorial Hospital

Private
 Albert Road Clinic – Melbourne
 Avenue Plastic Surgery – Windsor
 Beleura Private Hospital – Mornington
 Bellbird Private Hospital – Blackburn South
 Berwick Eye and Surgicentre – Berwick
 Cabrini Brighton – Brighton
 Cabrini Health Elsternwick Rehabilitation – Glenhuntly Rd – Elsternwick
 Cabrini Health Elsternwick Rehabilitation – Hopetoun – Elsternwick
 Cabrini Malvern – Malvern
 Cabrini Prahran – Prahran
 Chesterville Day Hospital – Cheltenham
 Como Private Hospital – Parkdale
 Corymbia House – Dandenong
 Cotham Private Hospital – Kew
 Donvale Rehabilitation Hospital – Donvale
 Dorset Rehabilitation Centre – Pascoe Vale
 Epworth Cliveden – East Melbourne
 Epworth Eastern – Box Hill
 Epworth Freemasons [Clarendon Street] – East Melbourne
 Epworth Freemasons [Victoria Parade] – East Melbourne
 Epworth Hawthorn – Hawthorn
 Epworth Rehabilitation Brighton – Brighton
 Epworth Rehabilitation Camberwell – Camberwell
 Epworth Rehabilitation Richmond – Richmond
 Epworth Richmond – Richmond
 Frances Perry House – Parkville
 Glen Eira Day Surgery – Caulfield South
 Glenferrie Private Hospital – Hawthorn
 Healthscope Independence Services – Moorabbin
 Hobsons Bay Endoscopy Centre Altona – Altona
 Hobsons Bay Endoscopy Centre Sydenham – Sydenham
 Hobsons Bay Endoscopy Centre Werribee – Werribee
 John Fawkner Private Hospital – Coburg
 Jolimont Endoscopy – East Melbourne
 Knox Private Hospital – Wantirna
 Linacre Private Hospital – Hampton
 Manningham Day Procedure Centre – Templestowe Lower
 Maryvale Private Hospital – Morwell
 Masada Private Hospital – St Kilda
 Melbourne MediBrain & MediSleep Centre – Caulfield North
 Melbourne Oral & Facial Surgery – Melbourne
 Melbourne Private Hospital – Parkville
 Mildura Private Hospital – Mildura
 Mitcham Private Hospital – Mitcham
 Mulgrave Private Hospital- Mulgrave
 Murray Valley Private Hospital – Wodonga
 North Eastern Rehabilitation Centre – Ivanhoe
 Northpark Private Hospital – Bundoora
 Peninsula Private Hospital Victoria – Frankston
 Ringwood Private Hospital – Ringwood
 Rosebud SurgiCentre – Rosebud West
 Shepparton Private Hospital – Shepparton
Skin Only – Skin cancer specialty clinic 
 South Eastern Private – Noble Park
 St John of God Ballarat Hospital – Ballarat
 St John of God Bendigo Hospital – Bendigo
 St John of God Berwick Hospital – Berwick
 St John of God Frankston Rehabilitation Hospital – Frankston
 St John of God Geelong Hospital – Geelong
 St John of God Langmore Centre – Berwick
 St John of God Warrnambool Hospital – Warrnambool
 St Vincent's Private Hospital East Melbourne – East Melbourne
 St Vincent's Private Hospital Fitzroy – Fitzroy
 St Vincent's Private Hospital Kew – Kew
 The Avenue Hospital – Windsor
 The Bays Hospital – Mornington
 The Geelong Clinic – St Albans Park
 The Melbourne Clinic – Richmond
 The Victoria Clinic – Prahran
 The Victorian Rehabilitation Centre – Glen Waverley
 Victoria Parade Surgery Centre – East Melbourne
 Vision Day Surgery Camberwell – Camberwell
 Vision Day Surgery Eastern – Box Hill
 Vision Day Surgery Footscray – Footscray
 Vision Eye Institute – Melbourne
 Wangaratta Private Hospital – Wangaratta
 Warringal Private Hospital – Heidelberg
 Waverley Private Hospital – Mount Waverley
Werribee Mercy Hospital – Werribee
 Western Private Hospital – Footscray

Western Australia

Public
 Albany Health Campus – Albany
 Armadale-Kelmscott Memorial Hospital – Armadale
 Augusta Hospital – Augusta
 Bentley Hospital – Bentley
 Beverley Hospital – Beverley
 Boddington Health Service – Boddington
 Boyup Brook Soldiers Memorial Hospital – Boyup Brook
 Bridgetown Hospital – Bridgetown
 Broome Health Campus – Broome
 Bruce Rock Memorial Hospital – Bruce Rock
 Busselton Health Campus – Busselton
 Carnarvon Health Campusl – Carnarvon
 Collie Health Service – Collie
 Corrigin District Hospital – Corrigin
 Cunderdin Hospital – Cunderdin
 Dalwallinu Hospital – Dalwallinu
 Denmark Hospital and Health Service – Denmark
 Derby Hospital – Derby
 Dongara Eneabba Mingenew Health Service – Dongara
 Donnybrook Hospital – Donnybrook
 Dumbleyung Memorial Hospital – Dumbleyung
 Esperance Hospital – Esperance
 Exmouth Hospital – Exmouth
Fiona Stanley Hospital – Murdoch
 Fitzroy Crossing Hospital – Fitzroy Crossing
 Fremantle Hospital – Fremantle
 Geraldton Hospital – Geraldton
 Gnowangerup Hospital – Gnowangerup
 Goomalling Hospital – Goomalling
 Graylands Selby-Lemnos and Special Care Health Service – Mount Claremont
 Halls Creek Hospital – Halls Creek
 Harvey Hospital – Harvey
 Hedland Health Campus – South Hedland
 Joondalup Health Campus (Public) – Joondalup
 Kalamunda Hospital – Kalamunda
 Kalbarri Health Centre – Kalbarri
 Kaleeya Hospital – East Fremantle
 Kalgoorlie Hospital – Kalgoorlie
 Katanning Hospital – Katanning
 Kellerberrin Memorial Hospital – Kellerberrin
 King Edward Memorial Hospital for Women – Subiaco
 Kojonup Hospital – Kojonup
 Kondinin Districts Health Service – Kondinin
 Kununoppin Health Service – Kununoppin
 Kununurra Hospital – Kununurra
 Lake Grace Hospital – Lake Grace
 Laverton Hospital – Laverton
 Leonora Hospital – Leonora
 Margaret River Hospital – Margaret River
 Meekatharra Hospital – Meekatharra
 Merredin Health Service – Merredin
 Moora Hospital – Moora
 Morawa Health Service – Morawa
 Mullewa Health Service – Mullewa
 Murray Hospital – Pinjarra
 Nannup Hospital – Nannup
 Narembeen Memorial Hospital – Narembeen
 Narrogin Hospital – Narrogin
 Newman Hospital – Newman
 Next Step Drug And Alcohol Services, East Perth – East Perth
 Nickol Bay Hospital – Karratha
 Norseman Hospital – Norseman
 North Midlands Health Service – Three Springs
 Northam Hospital – Northam
 Northampton Kalbarri Health Service – Northampton
 Onslow Hospital – Onslow
 Osborne Park Hospital – Stirling
 Paraburdoo Hospital – Paraburdoo
 Peel Health Campus – Mandurah
 Pemberton Hospital – Pemberton
 Perth Children's Hospital – Nedlands
 Pingelly Hospital – Pingelly
 Plantagenet Hospital – Mount Barker
 Princess Margaret Hospital for Children – Subiaco
 Quairading Hospital – Quairading
 Ravensthorpe Health Centre – Ravensthorpe
 Rockingham General Hospital – Cooloongup
 Roebourne Hospital – Roebourne
 Royal Perth Hospital Shenton Park Campus – Shenton Park
 Royal Perth Hospital Wellington Street Campus – Perth
 Selby Authorised Lodge – Shenton Park
 Sir Charles Gairdner Hospital – Nedlands
 South West Health Campus – Bunbury
 Southern Cross Hospital – Southern Cross
 State Forensic Mental Health Service – Mount Claremont
 St John of God Midland Public Hospital
 Tom Price Hospital – Tom Price
 Wagin Hospital – Wagin
 Warren Hospital – Manjimup
 Wongan Hills Hospital – Wongan Hills
 Wyalkatchem-Koorda and Districts Hospital – Wyalkatchem
 Wyndham Hospital – Wyndham
 York Hospital – York

Private
 Abbotsford Private Hospital – West Leederville
 Attadale Private Hospital – Attadale
 Bethesda Hospital – Claremont
 Colin Street Day Hospital – West Perth
 Glengarry Private Hospital – Duncraig
 Hollywood Private Hospital – Nedlands
 Joondalup Health Campus (Private) – Joondalup
 Mount Hospital – West Perth
 Oxford Day Surgery and Dermatology – Mount Hawthorn
 Perth Clinic – West Perth
Sentiens Hospital – West Perth
 South Perth Hospital – South Perth
 St John of God Bunbury Hospital – Bunbury
 St John of God Geraldton Hospital – Geraldton
 St John of God Mt Lawley Hospital – Mount Lawley
 St John of God Midland Private Hospital
 St John of God Murdoch Hospital – Murdoch
 St John of God Subiaco Hospital – Subiaco
 Subiaco Private Hospital – Subiaco
 Waikiki Private Hospital – Waikiki
 Walcott Street Surgical Centre – Mount Lawley
West Leederville Private Hospital, McCourt Street - West Leederville
 Westminster Day Surgery – Westminster

See also 

 Little Company of Mary Health Care (Australia)
 List of Australian hospital ships
 List of Australian psychiatric institutions

References

External links

 Australian Government managed database of Australia hospitals, and performance data.
List of all Queensland Health Hospitals and Health Services
List of Hospitals and social networks in Australia